Sylvia Nduka (born 14 October 1992) is a Nigerian former beauty pageant winner and entrepreneur.

Early life 
Sylvia Nduka is from Isuofia in Anambra State. She is the  youngest of five siblings. She studied accounting at the University of Lagos.

Career

Most Beautiful Girl in Nigeria 2011 
She competed as Miss Taraba in the pageant. As the winner, she was awarded a Hyundai car and 3 million naira.

Project
The focus of her project, 'Sylvia Educational Foundation', was creating an NGO that empowered people through education and served less-privileged children.

Personal life 
Sylvia Nduka founded and runs Sylvia's Hair, a hair extension business.

References 

1992 births
Living people
Igbo people
Miss World 2011 delegates
Most Beautiful Girl in Nigeria winners
Most Beautiful Girl in Nigeria
Nigerian beauty pageant winners
People from Anambra State